The 2021 Birmingham Legion FC season was the club's third season of existence and their third in the USL Championship, the second tier of American soccer.

Roster

Competitions

Exhibitions

USL Championship

Standings — Central Division

Results summary

Results by round

Match results
Birmingham's schedule was announced on March 30 featuring 32 matches, 28 of which were contested against Central Division opponents.

USL Cup Playoffs

Statistics

Appearances and goals

Disciplinary record

Clean sheets

See also
 Birmingham Legion FC
 2021 in American soccer
 2021 USL Championship season

References

Birmingham Legion
Birmingham Legion
Birmingham Legion